Cephalocarpus is a genus of flowering plants belonging to the family Cyperaceae.

Its native range is Southern Tropical America.

Species:

Cephalocarpus confertus 
Cephalocarpus dracaenula 
Cephalocarpus glabra 
Cephalocarpus obovoideus 
Cephalocarpus rigidus

References

Cyperaceae
Cyperaceae genera